Andreas Raudsepp (born 13 December 1993) is an Estonian professional footballer who plays as a midfielder.

Club career
Raudsepp joined the Levadia Football Academy in 2007. In 2010, he was loaned out to Tulevik and made his Meistriliiga debut on 10 July 2010 against his parent club Levadia. He made his debut for Levadia on 27 August 2011 in a 0–3 away win against Paide Linnameeskond.

International career
Raudsepp represented Estonia in the 2012 UEFA European Under-19 Championship. He made his international debut for the senior national team on 27 December 2014 against Qatar.

Career statistics

Club

International

Honours

Club
Levadia
Meistriliiga: 2013, 2014
Estonian Cup: 2011–12, 2013–14
Estonian Supercup: 2013, 2015

References

External links

1993 births
Living people
Estonian footballers
Association football midfielders
FCI Levadia Tallinn players
FC Warrior Valga players
Viljandi JK Tulevik players
Estonia international footballers
Sportspeople from Rakvere
FCI Levadia U21 players
JK Tallinna Kalev players
Meistriliiga players